Norman Teague (born 1968) is an American social practice artist, designer, furniture maker, and educator. Teague co-founded the Chicago-based design studio, blkHaUs Studios, and in 2019 went on to form his own Norman Teague Design Studios. In addition to his studio practices Teague currently resides as a professor in the school of industrial design at University of Illinois Chicago.

Early life and education 
Teague grew up on the South Side of Chicago in Bronzeville, and he is African American.

Originally interested in pursuing a career in architecture, Teague attended Harold Washington College. He went to further his studies at Colombia College Chicago, but after exposure to wood shop and smaller scale design he pivoted his focus to industrial Design. Teague received an BA degree in product design from Colombia College Chicago in 2014. He then went on to pursue a master's degree in designed objects from The School of the Art Institute of Chicago, which he received in 2016.

Career 
In 2016, Teague co-founded with Fo Wilson the design studio blkHaUs Studios in Chicago. Their work was focused on making public spaces in Chicago more inviting for the public.

In 2019, he went on to form his own Norman Teague Design Studios. Teague's work seeks to use design to "empower brown and black communities".

He is best known for his furniture, some of which resides in the museum collection of The Art Institute of Chicago, and the  Los Angeles County Museum of Art (LACMA). He has also worked in performance art, installation art, and sculpture. Teague has worked with notable collaborators such as Theaster Gates, and acted as a consultant on The Barack Obama Presidential Center with the firm Ralph Applebaum. His work was in the 2021 Chicago Architecture Biennial.

References 

Wikipedia Student Program
Living people
People from Chicago
University of Illinois Chicago faculty
Columbia College Chicago alumni
School of the Art Institute of Chicago alumni
African-American designers
American furniture designers
African-American sculptors
1968 births